The 1990 Giro d'Italia was the 73rd edition of the Giro d'Italia, one of cycling's Grand Tours. The field consisted of 197 riders, and 163 riders finished the race.

By rider

By nationality

References

1990 Giro d'Italia
1990